Giuseppe de Samuele Cagnazzi was an Italian politician of the Kingdom of Naples. He was an inspector and director of the customs department of the Kingdom of Naples. He was the elder brother of Italian scientist and economist Luca de Samuele Cagnazzi.

Life 
Giuseppe de Samuele Cagnazzi was born in Altamura on March 19, 1763, to Livia Nesti and Ippolito Cagnazzi. He was the brother of Italian scientist and economist Luca de Samuele Cagnazzi and, after the premature loss of their father, their father's friend Carlo de Marco took care of the two siblings, especially their education, in order to ensure them a prestigious careers in politics. They both studied in the first years in the Royal College of Bari Real Collegio and subsequently they completed their studies at the University of Altamura.

During the Altamuran Revolution (1799), Giuseppe Cagnazzi, according to the extensive research carried out by historian Vincenzo Vicenti, joined it and then he left the Altamura in order to escape death. He left his wife and children inside the city and later he managed to return to his hometown. His wife was Elisabetta de Gemmis, daughter of the scholar Ferrante de Gemmis, and he had four children from her; according to the autobiography of his brother Luca de Samuele Cagnazzi, Elisabetta de Gemmis died in 1799 in the aftermath of the Altamuran Revolution. Giuseppe Cagnazzi, therefore, became a widower when he was only 36. Historian Vincenzo Vicenti managed to find a source in which Giuseppe Cagnazzi wrote that she was victim of "the bloody horrors of the brigands", which caused her premature death"

When Joseph Bonaparte ascended the throne of the Kingdom of Naples, he was rehabilitated and received prestigious public positions, first in the cutoms department and later in the tobacco industry.

In Avellino, Giuseppe Cagnazzi was also asked to teach mathematics to the children of some notable French officers. Among them was Victor Hugo, son of Joseph Léopold Sigisbert Hugo, then governor of that province. Giuseppe Cagnazzi died on May 29, 1837, of "pectoral influx".

He was also known in the field of music as an amateur violin and viola player. Moreover, an instrumental music academy was held in his house twice a week with teachers paid by him. "He Reciped instrumental productions by renowned French and German authors and invited talented teachers, such as Vincenzo Bellini".

Positions 
 Ispettore dei dazi indiretti of the Kingdom of Naples (1807-?)
 Direttore dei dazi indiretti of the Kingdom of Naples
 Director of the fabbrica della grande economia dei tabacchi of the Kingdom of Naples
 Victor Hugo's math teacher

Relatives 
 Ippolito de Samuele Cagnazzi - father
 Livia Nesti - mother
 Luca de Samuele Cagnazzi (1764-1852) - brother
 Elisabetta de Gemmis (?-1799) - wife
 Ippolito de Samuele Cagnazzi - son (married to Mariantonia Martucci, nicknamed Antonietta)

Bibliography

References

See also 
 Luca de Samuele Cagnazzi
 Altamuran Revolution
 Ferrante de Gemmis
 Gioacchino de Gemmis

Kingdom of Naples
Kingdom of the Two Sicilies
University of Altamura
Victor Hugo
19th-century Italian politicians
Politicians from Naples
People from Altamura
1763 births
1837 deaths